HIL or hil may refer to:

 Hil, Azerbaijan, a village
 HIL bus, a computer bus
 Hil Hernández (born 1984), Chilean beauty pageant winner
 Eduard Hil (1934–2012), Russian singer
 Hardware-in-the-loop simulation
 Hiligaynon language, ISO 639 code for a language spoken in the Philippines
 Hill International, an American international construction consulting firm
 Hillside railway station, England; National Rail station code HIL.
 Hindustan Insecticides, an Indian chemical company
 Hyderabad Industries Limited
 Hockey India League
 Lillehammer University College
 Shilavo Airport, in Ethiopia

See also
 
 Hill (disambiguation)